Combined gas or gas (COGOG) is a propulsion system for ships using gas turbine engines. A high efficiency, low output turbine is used for cruising speeds with a high output turbine being used for high-speed operations. A clutch allows either turbine to be selected, but there is no gearbox to allow operation of both turbines at once. This has the advantage of not requiring heavy, expensive and potentially unreliable gearboxes. The reason that a smaller turbine is used for cruising is that a small turbine running at 100% power is more fuel efficient than a bigger turbine running at 50% power.

The system is currently used in the 2 ships of the Russian Navy's s, the Japanese Maritime Self-Defense Force's Hatsuyuki-class destroyers, and the Royal Netherlands Navy s (on which the Greek Navy s are based). It was formerly used in the Royal Navy's Type 42 destroyer and Type 22 frigate, as well as the Royal Canadian Navy's Iroquois-class destroyer.

Development
Having previously pioneered the combined diesel or gas (CODOG) system, in 1968 the Royal Navy converted an old frigate, to COGOG propulsion as a test bed for use in later ships. Because developing a new gas turbine purely for marine use would be very expensive, it was decided to adapt a Rolls-Royce Olympus engine, which had been originally designed for the Avro Vulcan bomber and further developed for the Concorde supersonic airliner.

Even before the Exmouth trials had started, the Royal Navy had already ordered the first class of vessels to be designed from the start for COGOG propulsion, the Type 21 frigates, in which the Proteus turbines were replaced by a pair of Rolls-Royce Tyne engines.

Disadvantages
The operation of large gas turbines on ships produces a high volume of very hot exhaust gasses, which can hinder onboard helicopter operations, and also greatly increases a ship's infrared signature making it more conspicuous to enemy sensors and guided weapons. The ducting and filters required take up a considerable amount of space in a ship, and the volume of air being drawn in can exacerbate an internal fire. This was found to be a factor in the loss of  during the 1982 Falklands War. Many navies have now abandoned pure gas turbine propulsion in favour of combined diesel-electric and gas (CODLAG) systems.

References

Marine propulsion